Carposina latebrosa is a moth in the family Carposinidae. It was described by Edward Meyrick in 1910. It is found in Australia, where it has been recorded from Tasmania.

References

Carposinidae
Moths described in 1910
Moths of Australia